The First Presbyterian Church of Yorktown is a Presbyterian church in Yorktown Heights, New York. The current church building is the third in the history of the congregation, completed in 1840.

History 
The congregation dates back to 1730. A meeting house was built in 1738, and a first resident pastor led the congregation from 1761. During the Revolutionary War, the church was used as barracks. It was destroyed by British troops in June 1779. A second church was built in 1785. A third church in the same style replaced it in 1840.

References

External links 
 

Presbyterian churches in New York (state)
Churches in Westchester County, New York
National Register of Historic Places in Westchester County, New York
Greek Revival church buildings in New York (state)
Churches completed in 1730
18th-century Presbyterian church buildings in the United States
Churches on the National Register of Historic Places in New York (state)